Darmanin is a surname. Notable people include:

Edward Darmanin (born 1945), Maltese footballer 
Gérald Darmanin,  (born 1982) French politician, Minister of the Interior
Lisa Darmanin (born 1991), Australian sailor
Paul Darmanin (born 1940), Maltese catholic prelate; Bishop of Garissa, Kenya
Saviour Darmanin (born 1977), Maltese footballer

Maltese-language surnames